is the 15th single by Japanese entertainer Miho Nakayama. Written by Chinfa Kan and Cindy, the single was released on February 21, 1989, by King Records.

Background and release
"Rosécolor" was used by Shiseido for their spring 1989 commercials featuring Nakayama.

"Rosécolor" became Nakayama's fifth consecutive No. 1 on Oricon's weekly singles chart. It sold over 277,000 copies and was certified Gold by the RIAJ.

Cindy self-covered the song on her 1991 album Don't Be Afraid and the 1997 album Surprise.

Track listing
All music is arranged by Yūji Toriyama.

Charts
Weekly charts

Year-end charts

Certification

References

External links

1989 singles
1989 songs
Japanese-language songs
Miho Nakayama songs
Songs with lyrics by Chinfa Kan
King Records (Japan) singles
Oricon Weekly number-one singles